The Togo Baptist Convention  is a Baptist Christian denomination in Togo. It is affiliated with the Baptist World Alliance. The headquarters is in Lomé.

History

The Convention has its origins in the establishment of the first Baptist Church in Lomé by Nigerians in 1919 and a mission of the Ghana Baptist Convention in 1950. CBT is officially founded in 1964 under the name of "Association of Baptist Churches of Togo" (Association des Eglises Baptistes du Togo). In 1971, it participated in the founding of the West African Baptist Advanced School of Theology (WABAST) in Lomé. In 1983, churches were established in the Est-Mono Prefecture. In 1988, it takes the name of "Togo Baptist Convention". According to a denomination census released in 2020, it claimed 535 churches and 22,748 members.

References

External links
 Official Website

Baptist denominations in Africa
Evangelicalism in Togo